CRDL may refer to:

 Canberra Roller Derby League, a Canberra-based roller derby league
 Team CRDL, a group of characters from RWBY
 Civil Rights Digital Library, an initiative to promote understanding of racial equality (see Digital Library of Georgia)